Tonya Gonnella Frichner (September 19, 1947 – February 14, 2015) was an American activist and lawyer, known for her Indigenous international work, particularly for her contributions to the United Nations Declaration on the Rights of Indigenous Peoples.

Early life and education
Tonya Gonnella Frichner was born in Syracuse, New York, on Sept. 19, 1947. Her father, Henry, worked construction and her mother, Maxine, served on the school board, where, as an Onondaga, she sought to promote a Native American curriculum. Maxine and Tonya were citizens of the Onondaga Nation (Snipe Clan), and Maxine's brother was an Onondaga chief.

Frichner graduated from St. John's Catholic Academy, a high school in Syracuse. She earned a Bachelor of Science Degree, magna cum laude, from St. John's University in New York City in 1980 and her Juris Doctor from the City University of New York School of Law in 1987.

Legal work
Shortly after graduating from law school, Frichner served as a delegate for and was of legal counsel to the Haudenosaunee (Iroquois) Confederacy at the UN Sub-Commission on the Human Rights/Working Group on Indigenous Populations in Geneva, Switzerland. Beginning in 1987, she sat on the Board of Directors and served as legal counsel to the Iroquois Nationals Lacrosse Project, the national team of the Haudenosaunee Confederacy. She served on several other boards, including the Seventh Generation Fund for Indian Development and the Boarding School Healing Project.

In 1989 Frichner founded and served as president of the American Indian Law Alliance, an Indigenous Peoples advocacy group based in New York City. The Alliance is a NGO with Consultative Status to the United Nations Social and Economic Council and Frichner also served a three-year term (2008-2010) as the North American Representative to the United Nations Permanent Forum on Indigenous Issues. She was key in the drafting, negotiations and passage of the United Nations Declaration on the Rights of Indigenous Peoples.

Simultaneously, she taught Federal Indian Law, Human Rights Law and Native American History at several New York City-area colleges and universities, including City College, the City University of New York (1991-1999); Hunter College (1993); New York University (1994); and Manhattanville College (2000-2008).

Writing

Recognitions and awards
She had received numerous awards in recognition of her work, including the Harriet Tubman Humanitarian Achievement Award, the Female Role Model of the Year from the Ms. Foundation for Women, the Thunderbird Indian of the Year Award, the Ellis Island Medal of Honor,  the Ingrid Washinawatok El-Issa O’Peqtaw Metaehmoh – Flying Eagle Woman Fund for Peace, Justice, and Sovereignty Award, and the NY County Lawyers Association Award for Outstanding Public Service. She also received an honorary degree from Colby College in 2012. She died February 14, 2015.

External links
Frichner's United Nations member profile
Tonya Gonnella Frichner papers at the Sophia Smith Collection, Smith College

References

American women lawyers
Native American lawyers
Native American activists
Onondaga people
1947 births
2015 deaths
21st-century American women